Eğirdir station, was the terminal station of the Oriental Railway Company (ORC) main line from Izmir.

The station was never meant to be a terminal station because the ORC intended to extend the line to Konya.

Built in 1912, the station was closed in 2003.

External links
http://www.trainsofturkey.com/w/pmwiki.php/Stations/Egirdir

Railway stations opened in 1912
Railway stations in Isparta Province
Railway stations closed in 2003
Defunct railway stations in Turkey
1912 establishments in the Ottoman Empire